Július Gábriš (5 December 1913 in Tesárske Mlyňany – 13 November 1987 in Trnava) was a Slovak Bishop, Apostolic Administrator of Archdiocese of Trnava during communist-controlled Czechoslovakia.

Biography
Born 1913 in Tesárske Mlyňany, he was educated in Zlaté Moravce, Comenius University in Bratislava and at the seminary in Trnava. He was ordained on 26 June 1938 by Pavol Jantausch. He worked as priest in Tekovské Šarluhách, Holíč and Stupava. In 1951 he was promoted to dean in Jablonice, and soon after Nové Mesto nad Váhom.

In 1969 Ambróz Lazík, apostolic administrator of Trnava, died and then Pope Paul VI appointed him as successor. However his appointment was opposed by the communist government of Czechoslovakia and it was only 4 years later, on 3 March 1973, that he was able to receive official consecration which took place in Nitra by Cardinal Casaroli, František Tomášek, and Trochty. Following the 1977 normalization of relations between the Czech State and the Church he was raised to the rank of archbishop. He was also titular bishop of Decori. He died in 1987 in Trnava.

References

1913 births
1987 deaths